Live At Last is the first live album by the American progressive rock band Enchant, released in 2004.
The album was recorded at I-Musicast in Oakland, CA, on March 13, 2004

Track listing
 "Mae Dae" [instrumental] (Benignus, Ott) – 3:23
 "At Death's Door" (Cline, Craddick) – 7:15
 "Sinking Sand" (Leonard, Ott, Platt) – 7:46
 "Under Fire" (Leonard, Ott) – 6:11
 "Broken Wave" (Craddick, Ott) – 5:46
 "Blindsided" (Craddick, Leonard) – 6:45
 "Acquaintance" (Ott) – 7:04
 "Monday" (Leonard, Ott) – 7:58
 "Progtology" (Ott) – 6:54
 "The Thirst" (Ott) – 6:39
 "Paint the Picture" (Ott) – 6:50
 "Under the Sun" (Leonard, Ott, Platt) – 7:40
 "What to Say" (Craddick, Leonard, Ott) – 4:57
 "My Enemy" (Geimer, Leonard) – 6:51
 "Follow the Sun" (Ott) – 6:05
 "Break" (Ott) – 4:48
 "Seeds of Hate" (Leonard, Ott) – 6:21
 "Comatose" (Ott) – 8:58
 "Black Eyes & Broken Glass" (Craddick, Ott) – 4:44
 "Colors Fade" (Craddick, Ott) – 5:12
 "Pure" (Craddick, Ott) – 7:33
 "Below Zero" (Ott) – 6:32
 "Oasis" (Leonard, Ott) – 9:13

Personnel
 Sean Flanegan – drums, percussion
 Bill Jenkins – keyboards
 Ted Leonard – guitar, vocals
 Douglas A. Ott – guitar, vocals
 Ed Platt – bass guitar

Production
 Stefan Beeking – photography
 Thomas Ewerhard – design, layout design
 Douglas A. Ott – liner notes, mixing
 Markus Teske – mastering

References

Enchant (band) albums
2004 live albums
Inside Out Music live albums